Barauni IOC Township is a census town at Barauni in Begusarai district in the state of Bihar, India.

Demographics
 India census, Barauni IOC Township had a population of 13,825. Males constitute 55% of the population and females 45%. Barauni IOC Township has an average literacy rate of 82%, higher than the national average of 59.5%; with 58% of the males and 42% of females literate. 13% of the population is under 6 years of age.

References

by:-rajnikant kumar

Cities and towns in Begusarai district
Barauni
Townships in India